Dániel Lukács (born 3 April 1996) is a Hungarian football player who plays for Diósgyőr.

Career

Budapest Honvéd
On 28 November 2015, Lukács played his first match for Budapest Honvéd in a 3-2 win against Békéscsaba in the Hungarian League.

Club statistics

Updated to games played as of 5 February 2023.

References

External links
 
 

1996 births
Living people
Footballers from Budapest
Hungarian footballers
Association football forwards
Rákospalotai EAC footballers
Budapest Honvéd FC players
Budapest Honvéd FC II players
Újpest FC players
Tiszakécske FC footballers
Kecskeméti TE players
Diósgyőri VTK players
Nemzeti Bajnokság I players
Nemzeti Bajnokság II players